Paul Barnard (born 13 February 1973) is a former Australian rules footballer who played from 1994 until 2003.

Originally from East Perth, where he played 29 games from 1992–93, Barnard's first two seasons of AFL were spent with Hawthorn. After managing only 11 games, he came to Essendon as part of a trade with Paul Salmon. He played as a utility and was a hard man. He kicked four goals in Essendon's grand final win over Melbourne in 2000.

At the end of the 2003 season, Barnard knew that his body had had enough of the physical battering from the rugged playing style that had earned him his reputation for toughness.

Playing statistics

|- style="background-color: #EAEAEA"
! scope="row" style="text-align:center" | 1994
|style="text-align:center;"|
| 27 || 3 || 2 || 4 || 10 || 4 || 14 || 3 || 0 || 0.7 || 1.3 || 3.3 || 1.3 || 4.7 || 1.0 || 0.0
|-
! scope="row" style="text-align:center" | 1995
|style="text-align:center;"|
| 27 || 8 || 2 || 2 || 92 || 43 || 135 || 38 || 7 || 0.3 || 0.3 || 11.5 || 5.4 || 16.9 || 4.8 || 0.9
|- style="background:#eaeaea;"
! scope="row" style="text-align:center" | 1996
|style="text-align:center;"|
| 16 || 15 || 3 || 8 || 107 || 93 || 200 || 47 || 21 || 0.2 || 0.5 || 7.1 || 6.2 || 13.3 || 3.1 || 1.4
|-
! scope="row" style="text-align:center" | 1997
|style="text-align:center;"|
| 16 || 5 || 0 || 1 || 34 || 14 || 48 || 13 || 3 || 0.0 || 0.2 || 6.8 || 2.8 || 9.6 || 2.6 || 0.6
|- style="background:#eaeaea;"
! scope="row" style="text-align:center" | 1998
|style="text-align:center;"|
| 16 || 17 || 4 || 5 || 116 || 84 || 200 || 68 || 14 || 0.2 || 0.3 || 6.8 || 4.9 || 11.8 || 4.0 || 0.8
|-
! scope="row" style="text-align:center" | 1999
|style="text-align:center;"|
| 16 || 22 || 6 || 3 || 151 || 132 || 283 || 69 || 15 || 0.3 || 0.1 || 6.9 || 6.0 || 12.9 || 3.1 || 0.7
|- style="background:#eaeaea;"
! scope="row" style="text-align:center" | 2000
|style="text-align:center;"|
| 16 || 22 || 10 || 9 || 182 || 104 || 286 || 84 || 24 || 0.5 || 0.4 || 8.3 || 4.7 || 13.0 || 3.8 || 1.1
|-
! scope="row" style="text-align:center" | 2001
|style="text-align:center;"|
| 16 || 24 || 25 || 14 || 233 || 132 || 365 || 136 || 48 || 1.0 || 0.6 || 9.7 || 5.5 || 15.2 || 5.7 || 2.0
|- style="background:#eaeaea;"
! scope="row" style="text-align:center" | 2002
|style="text-align:center;"|
| 16 || 24 || 23 || 22 || 191 || 104 || 295 || 106 || 37 || 1.0 || 0.9 || 8.0 || 4.3 || 12.3 || 4.4 || 1.5
|-
! scope="row" style="text-align:center" | 2003
|style="text-align:center;"|
| 16 || 11 || 4 || 1 || 59 || 58 || 117 || 37 || 14 || 0.4 || 0.1 || 5.4 || 5.3 || 10.6 || 3.4 || 1.3
|- class="sortbottom"
! colspan=3| Career
! 151
! 79
! 69
! 1175
! 768
! 1943
! 601
! 183
! 0.5
! 0.5
! 7.8
! 5.1
! 12.9
! 4.0
! 1.2
|}

References

External links

Australian rules footballers from Western Australia
Living people
1973 births
Hawthorn Football Club players
Essendon Football Club players
Essendon Football Club Premiership players
East Perth Football Club players
People from Bunbury, Western Australia
Carey Park Football Club players
Western Australian State of Origin players
One-time VFL/AFL Premiership players